Eliahu Ibrahim Jury (May 23, 1923 – September 20, 2020) was an Iraqi-born American engineer. He received his Doctor of Engineering Science degree from Columbia University of New York City in 1953. He was professor of electrical engineering at the University of California, Berkeley, and the University of Miami.

He developed the advanced Z-transform, used in digital control systems and signal processing. He was the creator of the Jury stability criterion, which is named after him.

He was a Life Fellow of the IEEE and received the Rufus Oldenburger Medal from the ASME, the First Education Award of IEEE Circuits and Systems Society, and the IEEE Millennium Medal. In 1993 he received the AACC's Richard E. Bellman Control Heritage Award.

Bibliography 
Theory and Application of the z-Transform Method, John Wiley and Sons, 1964.
Inners and stability of dynamic systems, John Wiley & Sons, 1974

References

1923 births
2020 deaths
21st-century American engineers
Academics from Baghdad
Iraqi emigrants to the United States
Columbia School of Engineering and Applied Science alumni
Control theorists
Iraqi engineers
People of Iraqi-Jewish descent
Richard E. Bellman Control Heritage Award recipients
UC Berkeley College of Engineering faculty
University of Miami faculty